The 2013–14 Ivy League men's basketball season marked the continuation of the annual tradition of competitive basketball among Ivy League members. The tradition began when the league was formed during the 1956–57 season and its history extends to the predecessor Eastern Intercollegiate Basketball League, which was formed in 1902.

Harvard won the regular season title outright and earned the conference's only 2014 NCAA Men's Division I Basketball Tournament bid. Overall, the conference had five postseason participants and won eight postseason games, marking the best postseason in league history.

Wesley Saunders of Harvard was named Ivy League Men's Basketball Player of the Year. James Jones of Yale was named Ivy League Coach of the Year and Spencer Weisz of Princeton was named Ivy League Freshman of the Year. Brown's Cedric Kuakumensah earned his second consecutive Ivy League Defensive Player of the Year recognition.

Saunders was an Associated Press honorable mention NCAA Men's Basketball All-American. On February 20, Matt Townsend of Yale was named a third team Academic All-American selection. Penn's Dau Jok was named to the Allstate Good Works Team by the National Association of Basketball Coaches (NABC) and earned the Most Courageous Award from the United States Basketball Writers Association (USBWA).

The NABC named Saunders, T.J. Bray of Princeton and Justin Sears of Yale to the All-District 13 First Team and Sean McGonagill of Brown and Siyani Chambers of Harvard to its Second Team. The USBWA named Saunders to its All-District I Team.

The All-Ivy teams were as follows:
FIRST TEAM ALL-IVY
Sean McGonagill, Brown (Sr., G - Brookfield, Ill.)
Alex Rosenberg, Columbia (Jr., F - Short Hills, N.J.)
*Wesley Saunders, Harvard (Jr., G/F - Los Angeles)
*T.J. Bray, Princeton (Sr., G - New Berlin, Wis.)
Justin Sears, Yale (So., F - Plainfield, N.J.)
*Unanimous

SECOND TEAM ALL-IVY
Maodo Lo, Columbia (So., G - Berlin)
Siyani Chambers, Harvard (So., G - Golden Valley, Minn.)
Steve Moundou-Missi, Harvard (Jr., F - Yaounde, Cameroon)
Laurent Rivard, Harvard (Sr., G - Saint-Bruno, Quebec, Canada)
Fran Dougherty, Penn (Sr., F - New Britain, Pa.)

NCAA tournament

College Basketball Invitational

CollegeInsider.com Postseason Tournament

References